The 14th Solitude Grand Prix was a non-Championship motor race, run to Formula One rules, held on 19 July 1964 at the Solitudering, near Stuttgart. The race was run over 20 laps of the circuit, and was won by Jim Clark in a Lotus 33, after a close battle with John Surtees in a Ferrari 158.

Seven drivers crashed out on the first lap due to heavy rain and standing water on the circuit.

Results

References

Solitude Grand Prix
Solituderennen
Solitude Grand Prix